Epipsestis albicosta is a moth in the family Drepanidae. It was described by Yoshimoto in 1993. It is found in Nepal.

References

Thyatirinae
Moths described in 1993